The denominations in the Latter Day Saint movement are sometimes collectively referred to as Mormonism. Although some denominations oppose the use of this term because they consider it derogatory, it is especially used when referring to the largest Latter Day Saint group, The Church of Jesus Christ of Latter-day Saints (LDS Church), and offshoots of it. Denominations opposed to the use of the term consider it to be connected to the polygamy once practiced by the Utah church or to pejoratives used against early adherents of the movement.

The Latter Day Saint movement includes:
 The original church within this movement, founded in April 1830 in New York by Joseph Smith, was the Church of Christ. It was later named the "Church of the Latter Day Saints". It was renamed the "Church of Jesus Christ of Latter Day Saints" in 1838 (stylized as the "Church of Jesus Christ of Latter-day Saints" in the United Kingdom), which remained its official name until Smith's death in 1844. This organization subsequently splintered into several different denominations, each of which claims to be the legitimate continuation of this original church. Most of these dispute the right of other denominations within the movement to claim this distinction.
 The largest denomination within the contemporary movement is the LDS Church, with approximately 16 million members. It is headquartered in Salt Lake City, Utah, and uses the term Latter-day Saints to describe itself and its members (note the hyphenation and variation in capitalization usage).
 The second-largest denomination is the Community of Christ (it was first named the "Reorganized Church of Jesus Christ of Latter Day Saints", which lasted from 1872 to 2001). This is a Missouri-based, 250,000-member denomination. Although members of this church have traditionally been called Latter Day Saints (without the hyphen), the Community of Christ has more recently stated that it rejects the use of the term Saints as a designation for its members in any official reference or publication.
 Other denominations within the movement either formed around various would-be successors to Smith, or else broke from denominations that did. These, together with the two denominations listed above, are detailed in the table of denominations within the Latter Day Saint movement, below.

Although a few small factions broke with Smith's organization during his lifetime, he retained the allegiance of the vast majority of Latter Day Saints until his death in June 1844. Following Smith's death, the movement underwent a leadership crisis which led to a schism within the church. The largest group followed Brigham Young and settled in what became the Utah Territory and is now the Utah-based LDS Church. The second-largest faction, Community of Christ, coalesced around Joseph Smith III, eldest son of Joseph Smith. Other would-be leaders included the senior surviving member of the First Presidency, Sidney Rigdon; the newly baptized James Strang from Wisconsin; and Alpheus Cutler, one of the Council of Fifty. Each of these men still retains a following as of 2014—however tiny it may be in some cases—and all of their organizations have undergone further schisms. Other claimants, such as Granville Hedrick, William Bickerton, and Charles B. Thompson, later emerged to start still other factions, some of which have further subdivided.

Categorizing the churches 

Given the large number of Latter Day Saint churches and their differing backgrounds, categorizing them can be difficult. In the field of Mormon studies, terms such as Rocky Mountain Saints are sometimes used for those denominations headquartered in the American West and Prairie Saints for those denominations that formed in and around Nauvoo, Illinois; Voree, Wisconsin; Independence, Missouri; and other locations in the Midwest and East. These terms do not necessarily relate the current geographical locations of all denominations within those two groupings, but rather the original location of their respective parent organizations, which may be seen in the table below.

Another method uses provenance: for instance, all denominations that ultimately trace their history back to the LDS Church based in Utah, are organized as one factional group. Divergent Paths of the Restoration—a reference work on this subject—follows this approach.

In such studies, and in general Latter Day Saint parlance, the -ite-suffixed terms Josephite and Brighamite have been used for the Missouri-based Community of Christ and the Utah-based LDS Church, respectively; these terms have sometimes been used to distinguish groups of denominations as well. Those denominations within each group share a common ancestry and basic beliefs that are different from groups sharing other provenances. The present article, in a similar fashion, distinguishes among groups of denominations by use of commonly understood names such as Mormon fundamentalist or else by short descriptions that often reference a founder of the first church within a factional group–for example, Joseph Smith III in reference to Community of Christ as well as various churches and factions that trace their origin to it.

List of Latter Day Saint movement churches

Era of Joseph Smith
Joseph Smith's original church, and those bodies which broke with him during his lifetime.

Original church within movement
The original organization, founded by Joseph Smith in 1830, later called the Church of the Latter-Day Saints and then The Church of Jesus Christ of Latter-Day Saints.

Churches that separated from Smith's organization prior to 1844
Other small churches formed on the basis of disagreements with Smith prior to his murder in 1844 (including church established by William Law within 1844), all of which are now defunct.

Lineage of Brigham Young

Sometimes called "Rocky Mountain Saints," "Brighamites," or "Mormons", tracing their leadership or influence through Brigham Young.

The Church of Jesus Christ of Latter-day Saints

By far the largest and best known Latter Day Saint church, which is colloquially, but imprecisely, referred to as the "Mormon Church". Some members consider this as derogatory to the organization and prefer to be called by their full title, or, "The Church of Jesus Christ".

Churches upholding polygamy after the Manifesto of 1890

Churches that believe they are strictly following the revelations and teachings of Joseph Smith and Brigham Young, including the practice of plural marriage, which was discontinued by the LDS Church in the late-19th century after the Manifesto.

Left-of-center LDS-derived churches

The defunct Godbeites and a few other small churches that broke with the LDS Church to pursue a more liberal, inclusive, or rationalist theology.

Additional churches claiming lineage through Brigham Young and/or founded in the U.S. Intermountain West

Several small churches rooted in Mormonism; formed under the belief that their leader was inspired to restore a new religious tradition in the mold of Joseph Smith

Other lineages

Those churches rejecting Brigham Young's leadership, in favor of some other claimant. These adherents are occasionally referred to, collectively, as "Prairie Saints."

Reorganized Church and other followers of Joseph Smith III ("Josephites")

The Reorganized Church of Jesus Christ of Latter Day Saints and related churches tracing their leadership through Joseph Smith III.

Followers of Granville Hedrick ("Hedrickites")

The Church of Christ (Temple Lot) and related churches tracing their leadership through Granville Hedrick.

Followers of Sidney Rigdon or William Bickerton ("Bickertonites")

Churches tracing their leadership through Sidney Rigdon or William Bickerton.

Followers of Alpheus Cutler ("Cutlerites")

The Church of Jesus Christ (Cutlerite) and related churches tracing their leadership through Alpheus Cutler.

Followers of James J. Strang ("Strangites")

The Church of Jesus Christ of Latter Day Saints (Strangite) and related churches tracing their leadership through James Strang.

Additional Latter Day Saint churches (usually headquartered in U.S. east of the Rocky Mountains)

Other "Prairie Saint" branches of the movement, such as the Church of Christ (Whitmerite), none of which is known to be extant.

Spontaneous or unknown lineage

Those denominations which originated independent from other organizations and do not trace their doctrinal or priesthood lineage to any 19th-century Latter Day Saint factions, but still hold Latter Day Saint beliefs.

Table of provenances

Gallery

See also 

 Mormonism
 Mormons: Groups within Mormonism
 Restoration (Latter Day Saints): Significance and impact
 Restorationism
 Saints in LDS movement

References

Further reading

Launius, Roger D.; Thatcher, Linda, eds. (April 1998), Differing Visions: Dissenters in Mormon History, Champaign, IL: University of Illinois Press, retrieved June 29, 2010

External links
 

 
Sect